The UEFA–CAF Meridian Cup was a football tournament that featured national teams from Europe and Africa among players under 18, and was part of the co-operation programme between UEFA and the CAF.

Meridian Project

The UEFA–CAF Meridian Cup was part of the Meridian Project, a co-operation agreement concluded by the African and European football confederations in Lisbon on 30 January 1997 to promote the exchange of cultures and to offer young footballers a unique learning experience within the framework of a footballing festival. It was held every two years.

Change of format

The competition evolved from its inception in 1997, running as an eight-team tournament until the 2005 event in Turkey after which the format was changed to a two-legged contest between two continental all-star U18 teams. The last UEFA–CAF Meridian Cup also involved an educational component consisting of joint training sessions and meetings of coaches from Europe and Africa. The 2007 event took place in Barcelona, Spain, and was hosted on the premises of FC Barcelona.

Regulations
The regulations for the UEFA–CAF Meridian Cup were initially drawn up by the UEFA Administration before being submitted to the UEFA Youth & Amateur Football Committee. They were then forwarded upon that committee's approval to the UEFA Executive Committee for ratification.

Tournaments

Meridian Project

New format

Teams reaching the top four

References

 
Meridian Cup
Meridian Cup
Under-18 association football
Recurring sporting events established in 1997
Recurring sporting events disestablished in 2007